Rita Schumacher (born 25 August 1937) is a German former swimmer. She competed in two events at the 1964 Summer Olympics.

References

1937 births
Living people
German female swimmers
Olympic swimmers of the United Team of Germany
Swimmers at the 1964 Summer Olympics
Sportspeople from Rostock